Kalisz Department was a unit of administrative division and local government in Polish Duchy of Warsaw in years 1807–1815.

Its capital city was Kalisz, and the area was further subdivided onto 13 powiats.

In 1815 it was transformed into the Kalisz Voivodeship.

Departments of the Duchy of Warsaw
States and territories established in 1807